Christian Laurent is an electrical engineer with the National Center for Scientific Research in Toulouse, France. Laurent was named a Fellow of the Institute of Electrical and Electronics Engineers (IEEE) in 2015 for his research into electrical aging and charge transport in insulating polymers.

References

Fellow Members of the IEEE
Living people
Year of birth missing (living people)
Place of birth missing (living people)